The 1927–28 Scottish Cup was the 50th staging of Scotland's most prestigious football knockout competition. The Cup was won by Rangers who defeated Celtic 4–0 in an Old Firm final; it was their first victory in the competition for 25 years – the last had been in 1903, with four defeats in finals since then.

First round

All matches were played on 21 January 1928 with the exception of the Dumbarton/Hamilton Academical match which was postponed due to a waterlogged pitch and played four days later.

Replays

The replays were played on 25 January 1928.

Second round 

The matches were played on 4 February 1928. All remaining non-league teams were knocked out.

Replays

The matches were played on 8 February 1928.

Third round 

The ties were drawn on 8 February 1928 and played on 18 February 1928.

Replays

The matches were played on 22 February 1928.

Fourth round

Semi-finals

Final

Teams

See also 
1927–28 in Scottish football

References 

 

Scottish Cup seasons
Scot
Cup